Westlicher Saalkreis ("Western Saale district") was a Verwaltungsgemeinschaft ("collective municipality") in the Saalekreis district, in Saxony-Anhalt, Germany. It was situated west of Halle (Saale). The seat of the Verwaltungsgemeinschaft was in Salzmünde. It was disbanded on 1 January 2010.

The Verwaltungsgemeinschaft Westlicher Saalkreis consisted of the following municipalities:

 Beesenstedt
 Bennstedt 
 Fienstedt 
 Höhnstedt 
 Kloschwitz 
 Lieskau 
 Salzmünde
 Schochwitz
 Zappendorf

Former Verwaltungsgemeinschaften in Saxony-Anhalt